Max Birger Johansson (September 20, 1910 – January 4, 1940) was a Finnish canoeist who competed in the 1936 Summer Olympics. In 1936 he finished seventh in the K-1 1000 metre competition.

He was killed in action during World War II.

References

External links
Sports-reference.com profile

1910 births
1940 deaths
Canoeists at the 1936 Summer Olympics
Finnish male canoeists
Olympic canoeists of Finland
Finnish military personnel killed in World War II